Boris Chiho Si (born 27 July 1994) is a Canadian professional soccer player.

College career
Si moved back to Canada in 2014, enrolling at the University of British Columbia. He played in 16 games in his first season and 10 in his second, scoring one goal in each.

Club career
Having played soccer locally with Coquitlam Metro Ford and Fusion FC, Si moved to Hong Kong in 2012, and spent two seasons in the Hong Kong First Division League (now the Hong Kong Premier League) with The Citizen Athletic Association.

In 2019, Si joined local Canadian side CCB LFC United.

Career statistics

Club

Notes

References

External links
 Boris Si at HKFA

1994 births
Living people
Association football midfielders
Canadian soccer players
UBC Thunderbirds soccer players
Citizen AA players
Hong Kong Premier League players
Soccer players from Vancouver